Niamh Wilson (born March 9, 1997) is a Canadian film and television actress from Oakville, Ontario, known for her role as Corbett in Saw III, reprised in Saw V; the Canadian horror film The Marsh (2006); and the title role in the Family Channel series Debra!

She was a regular on Degrassi: The Next Generation during seasons 13 and 14 as Jacqueline "Jack" Jones.

Career
Wilson began her career with a role in the Warner Brother's pilot Chasing Alice at the age of five. Although the TV Movie/pilot did not result in a series, she did meet Ralph Hemecker, who was to direct her in Haunting Sarah two years later. Her portrayal of Sarah Lewis garnered her a Young Artist Award in 2006. While in Los Angeles for the awards she and her mother created a CBC Radio radio documentary for the Outfront program called "Child Star Goes to Hollywood" about their road trip to Hollywood. Wilson was cast in Ice Planet as Commander Trager's (Michael Ironside) daughter. She has appeared in numerous films as well as episodic television, generally in dramatic adult-oriented vehicles; however, a comedic role eluded her until she was cast in the title role of Debra Delong in the Family Channel series Debra! produced by Cookie Jar Entertainment. The role was cast in 2010 when Wilson was only 12 years old. The pilot was shot in spring 2010; Family Channel picked up the series in summer 2010. and the first season was filmed in January - February 2011. The first episode premiered on Family Channel Saturday, June 4, 2011. Wilson won the Young Artist Award for Leading Actress in a TV Series for Debra! In May 2012, the series also won for Best Young Ensemble in a TV Series. This was the first time a TV series that was not aired in the United States had won these awards.

Personal life
Like her character on Degrassi, Jack Jones, Wilson is a dancer, practicing mainly in ballet, modern contemporary, and pointe. Wilson graduated from high school in June 2015 and attended George Brown College in Toronto, Ontario. She was accepted into their dance program for Technical and Performance Training in Ballet. As of 2018, Wilson was pursuing an anthropology major at the University of Toronto.

Filmography

Film

Television

Music Videos

Awards

References

External links

1997 births
Actresses from Ontario
Canadian child actresses
Canadian film actresses
Canadian television actresses
Living people
People from Oakville, Ontario